International trips made by the heads of state and heads of government to the United States have become a valuable part of American diplomacy and international relations since such trips were first made in the mid-19th century. They are complicated undertakings that often require months of planning along with a great deal of coordination and communication.

The first international visit to the United States was made by King Kalakaua of Hawaii in 1874, which was the first visit by a foreign chief of state or head of government.

The first European head of state to visit the United States was Prince Albert I of Monaco in 1913.

Albania

Armenia

Austria

Azerbaijan

Belarus

Belgium

Bosnia and Herzegovina

Bulgaria

Croatia

Cyprus

Czechoslovakia

Czech Republic

Denmark

Estonia

Finland

France

Georgia

Germany (Federal Republic of)

Germany (Democratic Republic of)

Greece

Hungary

Iceland

Ireland (Republic of)
Since the 1980s, it is customary for the Taoiseach of the day to visit the White House on Saint Patrick's Day and present the President with a bowl of shamrock.

Italy

Kosovo

Latvia

Liechtenstein

Lithuania

Luxembourg

Macedonia (Republic of)

Malta

Moldova

Monaco

Montenegro

Netherlands

Norway

Poland

Portugal

Romania

Russia

Slovakia

Slovenia

Soviet Union

Spain

Sweden

Switzerland

Turkey

Ukraine

United Kingdom

Yugoslavia

Holy See (Vatican City)

See also

 Foreign policy of the United States
 Foreign relations of the United States
 List of international trips made by presidents of the United States
 List of diplomatic visits to the United States
 State visit

References

External links
 Visits by Foreign Leaders – Office of the Historian (United States Department of State)

Europe